Cedar Park may refer to:

 Cedar Park (Galesville, Maryland), listed on the NRHP in Anne Arundel County, Maryland
 Cedar Park, Philadelphia, Pennsylvania, a neighborhood in Philadelphia, Pennsylvania
 Cedar Park, Seattle, a neighborhood in Seattle, Washington
 Cedar Park, Texas, a city located in Williamson County, Texas
 Cedar Park, Wisconsin, an unincorporated community
 Cedar Park Center, a concert venue and sports arena, in Cedar Park, Texas
 Cedar Park station (Exo), a commuter rail station on the RTM Vaudreuil–Hudson line in Pointe-Claire, Quebec, Canada
 Melrose/Cedar Park (MBTA station), a commuter rail station in Melrose, Massachusetts

See also  
Cedar (disambiguation)